Qasımalılar is a village and municipality in the Shamkir Rayon of Azerbaijan. It has a population of 855. The municipality consists of the villages of Qasımalılar and Göyməmmədli.

References 

Populated places in Shamkir District